The Morgan County Public Library is located in Martinsville, Indiana, and has five branches in addition to the main library.

History 
The Morgan County Public Library was founded in 1906 as the Martinsville Public Library in Martinsville, Indiana. Andrew Carnegie donated $12,500 for the library's construction, which was just sufficient to build a brick building. However, Martinsville city officials wanted a limestone structure, and raised as additional $2,400 through the sale of bonds. The library was built of Bedford limestone and opened in September 1908, with a collection of 1,500 books.

The Martinsville Public Library continued to operate, serving the citizens of Martinsville and the surrounding Washington Township, until 1971. In that year, the library merged with the Bookmobile service to become the Morgan County Contractual Library and expanded its operations to server the entire county except Brown Township (Moorseville). In 1976, the library again changed names to the current Morgan County Public Library.

In 1990, the library underwent a $1.7 million expansion and renovation. The main library is now more than four times larger than it was in 1908, and houses over 100,000 books. In addition, the library offers magazines, books on CD/cassette, DVD and movies, games, and public computers (as well as wireless connection). The main library has an extensive genealogy collection including digitized records, microfilm, local histories, yearbooks and other records in paper form. In all, there are over 180,000 items in circulation throughout the library system.  The Library has an extensive digital collection as well, offering downloadable ebooks and audiobooks through the Overdrive platform, and downloadable music through Freegal Music.

Additional historic renovation began in 1996 and included roof repairs, tuckpointing, and lead paint removal. On the exterior, trim was repainted and leaded glass replaced. An extensive interior remodeling included ceramic tile in the basement, new carpeting in all public areas, wallpaper removal and repainting.

The Morgan County Public Library currently provides library services at the Main Library in Martinsville and five branch locations in the towns of Brooklyn, Eminence, Monrovia, Morgantown and Waverly. In 2009, the Library became part of the Evergreen Indiana consortium which allows patrons access to over eight million items and over 100 libraries statewide.

References 
Library History Page

External links 
 Library Website

Morgan
Library buildings completed in 1908
Carnegie libraries in Indiana
Education in Morgan County, Indiana
Buildings and structures in Morgan County, Indiana
1908 establishments in Indiana